The Metropolitano Ligeiro de Mirandela or simply Metro de Mirandela was a metre gauge suburban rail service in Mirandela Municipality, northern Portugal. The service was closed on the 14th of December 2018.

During the day, trains ran with frequencies between of 26–160 minutes, operating between 7:45 to just past 18:00.

The service was operated between Carvalhais and Mirandela by two Série 9500 (LRV2000) diesel railcars.

References

External links
Metro de Mirandela (on the Mirandela Municipality official website)

Railway lines in Portugal
Metre gauge railways in Portugal
Railway lines opened in 1995
Railway lines closed in 2018